Abolin Rock, also known as Skala Abolina, is a large rock outcrop lying  west of the north end of Vindegga Spur in the Liebknecht Range, Humboldt Mountains, in Queen Maud Land. Discovered and plotted from air photos by Third German Antarctic Expedition, 1938–39. Mapped from air photos and surveys by Sixth Norwegian Antarctic Expedition, 1956–60; remapped by Soviet Antarctic Expedition, 1960–61, and named after Soviet botanist R.I. Abolin.

Rock formations of Queen Maud Land
Humboldt Mountains (Antarctica)